Sturnira angeli, also known as the Guadeloupe yellow-shouldered bat or Angel's yellow-shouldered bat, is a species of bat in the family Phyllostomidae. It is endemic to the Lesser Antilles. As of 2018 it is listed as near threatened by the IUCN.

Taxonomy 
The species was previously recognized as a subspecies of S. lilium. However, it has now been elevated to a species rank.

Description 
The bat is uniformly grayish-brown, lacking the 'yellow-shoulder' trait of its family.

Biology 
The species is frugivorous.

Distribution and habitat 
The species is found in the Martinique, Dominica, Guadeloupe and Montserrat islands in the Lesser Antilles. It is thought that the bat needs humid native forests to survive.

Conservation 
The species is listed as near-threatened, and almost meets the criteria for vulnerable (having extent of occurrence (EOO) of less than 15,504 km²).The species shows no sign of continued decline in population. The species, like other island species, faces threats from natural disasters like hurricanes and volcanic eruptions. It may also face a threat from change in land cover, and agricultural use.

References 

Sturnira
Mammals described in 1966
Bats of the Caribbean